Mount Cartwright is a sharp peak,  high, surmounting a north–south trending ridge  north-northwest of Mount Waterman in the Hughes Range. It was discovered and photographed by the United States Antarctic Service on Flight C of February 29 – March 1, 1940, and surveyed by A.P. Crary in 1957–58. It was named by Crary for Gordon Cartwright, first of the U.S. exchange International Geophysical Year scientists, who wintered at the Soviet Mirny Station, 1957.

References 

Mountains of the Ross Dependency
Dufek Coast